This article contains list of Qatar festivals.

Religious Festivals
Ramadan
Eid al-Fitr
Eid al-Adha

National Celebrations Day
Qatar National Day
Qatar National Sports Day

Specific Festivals
Doha Tribeca Film Festival
Art Festival of Qatar
Qatar Masters Golf Tournament
Qatar Open Men's Tennis Tournament
Qatar Open Women's Tennis Tournament
Qatar International Food Festival

Annual Festivals
Doha Cultural Festival

See also
 Culture of Qatar
 Qatari art
 Public holidays in Qatar
 Sport in Qatar

Qatar
Qatar
Festivals